A gravel bicycle is a type of bicycle intended for gravel cycling, including gravel racing. They are also sometimes known as "adventure bicycles", particularly ones intended for harsher off-road terrain.

While bicycles have been used for riding on such roads since bicycles were invented, the "modern" gravel bicycle, as a category, evolved in the 2000s, adopting technology from road bicycles, cyclocross bicycles and mountain bikes. They also share many characteristics of touring bicycles, such as relaxed geometry, wide tires and wide-range gearing.

Design characteristics

Gravel bikes have been constructed out of a wide variety of frame materials, including aluminium, carbon fibre, titanium and steel. Most use carbon fibre forks.

Gravel bicycles generally use drop bars, similar to racing and cyclocross bicycles, unlike mountain bikes and hybrid bicycles. Many gravel bikes are fitted with wider bars than would be typical for a road or cyclocross bike, and a few have been fitted with "flared" bars that angle outwards. Clip-on aerobar extensions are sometimes used, particularly in racing. 

Gravel bikes have frame geometry that is intermediate between a road bike and a cross-country mountain bike, leading to a bike that is slower to turn but more stable, particularly in low-traction descents, than a road bike or cyclocross bike.

Gravel bikes almost universally use disc brakes, and most use hydraulic discs.

Gravel bikes often have additional mounting points for bottle cages, as well as carriage points optimised for carrying bikepacking gear.

Suspension
The majority of gravel bikes sold to date rely on the cushioning of their wider tires, and controlled flexing in wheels, fork, and frame, to provide a cushioning effect. However, a few gravel bikes offer mechanical suspension in some form. Where offered, the suspension travel is typically limited to about 20-30 mm.

Examples of gravel bikes with suspension are the Lauf True Grit, which has a leaf spring front fork for suspension as well as the Cannondale Topstone Carbon Lefty, which has a pivoting seat stay and flexible chainstays to provide increased suspension, and a single-sided hydraulically-suspended "lefty" front fork. Both front and rear suspension offer around 30 mm of travel.

Drivetrain

The drivetrains for gravel bikes are mostly supplied by the three major groupset manufacturers, Shimano, SRAM, and Campagnolo, and, like other aspects of gravel bikes, offer a blend of characteristics from road and mountain bicycles. 

Unlike touring bicycles, where bar-end shifters remain quite commonly used, most gravel bicycles use integrated brake levers and shifting ("brifters") either identical to, or very similar to, modern racing bicycles. Electronic shifting is very common on high-end gravel bicycles.

Shimano and Campagnolo have branded families of dedicated gravel components, namely Shimano GRX and Campagnolo Ekar. SRAM does not have a dedicated gravel brand, using a mix of componentry from their mountain bike and road bike ranges.

Unlike on road bikes, where "2x" drivetrains with two front chainrings are ubiquitous, and unlike mountain bikes where "1x" drivetrains with a single front chainring are now standard on new bikes, both 1x and 2x drivetrain options are widely available for gravel bikes.

While chosen gearing depends on terrain and rider preference, it is typical for gravel bikes to offer slightly lower gearing than road bicycles.

Wheels
Gravel bike wheels are very similar to tubeless wheels used on some road and cyclocross bikes, and, indeed,
700c gravel wheelsets are often interchangeable with road and cyclocross wheelsets. 650b wheels used for gravel bikes are often derived from mountain bike wheels.

Cheaper gravel wheels usually have aluminium rims; carbon fibre is used for more expensive wheel sets. Aerodynamic shaping is used on some wheelsets to reduce drag, as on road bikes.

The main distinguishing features from tubeless road bike wheels are slightly more robust construction, and wider rim widths.

Pedals
Gravel bikes can be fitted with clipless pedals that use the Shimano SPD or compatible cleat system, ubiquitous on mountain and cyclocross bikes.

Tires

Gravel bikes are able to fit a wide range of tyres, from tyres used on road racing bicycles to the narrower end of mountain bike tyres.

Unlike cyclocross bikes, which are designed exclusively for 700c wheels and a maximum tyre width of around 33 mm (still wider than a typical racing bike tire of 28 mm), gravel bikes are designed to fit much wider 700c tires, often around 40 mm but sometimes up to 45–50 mm. Mountain bikes run wider tyres still. Some gravel bikes are fitted with 650b wheels, whose smaller diameter allows wider tyres to be fitted to a similarly configured frame. Like mountain bikes, the vast majority of gravel bikes use tubeless tires, as they are less susceptible to punctures and pinch flats than clincher tires.

Tire choice is a major point of debate in gravel racing, with riders trading off speed on sealed and high-quality dirt roads, weight, and puncture resistance and traction in dustier, sandier or muddier conditions.

References 

Gravel cycling
Cycle types